Ronald Robert Smith (born November 19, 1952) is a Canadian former ice hockey defenceman as well as a politician. He played 11 games in the National Hockey League for New York Islanders during the 1972–73 season. After his playing career he was elected Mayor of the Municipality of Port Hope, Ontario from 1994 to 2000.

Biography

Playing career
During the 1968-69 season Smith played for the Cobourg Cougars of the Eastern Ontario O.H.A. Junior B League. From 1969 to 1970, Smith played for the St. Catharines Black Hawks of the Canadian Hockey League (Ontario Hockey Association).  He was traded to the Sorel Black Hawks of the CHL (Quebec Major Junior A League) during the 1970-71 season. Smith was subsequently traded again prior to the 1971-72 season to the Cornwall Royals of the Quebec League. This trade was most fortunate for Smith and his teammates as the "Royals" won the 1972 Memorial Cup National Championship. Smith's initial professional career was commenced by splitting the 1972-73 season between playing with the New York Islanders of the National Hockey League and the New Haven Nighthawks of the American Hockey League.

Smith was selected by the New York Islanders as the first player in the 4th round of the 1972 NHL Amateur Draft of players (#49 overall).  He played 11 NHL games for the Islanders.  Later, Smith played for the Fort Worth Wings, the Fort Worth Texans of the Central Hockey League, Bodens BK in Sweden and the Erie Blades of the North American Hockey League.  He retired from play in 1977.

Post-playing career
Smith was elected and became the Mayor of the Municipality of Port Hope, Ontario from 1994 to 2000.

Career statistics

Regular season and playoffs

References

External links
 

1952 births
Living people
Canadian ice hockey defencemen
Cornwall Royals players
Erie Blades players
Fort Worth Wings players
Fort Worth Texans players
Ice hockey people from Ontario
New Haven Nighthawks players
New York Islanders draft picks
New York Islanders players
People from Northumberland County, Ontario
St. Catharines Black Hawks players
Sorel Éperviers players